The 10th Central American and Caribbean Age Group Championships in Athletics (Spanish: Campeonato Centroamericano y del Caribe Infantil de Pruebas Combinadas), were hosted by the Puerto Rican Athletics Federation (FAPUR), and were held at the Turabo University track in Caguas, Puerto Rico, on July 18–19, 2003.

Participation

The competition results are published. The participation of 74 athletes (40 boys and 34 girls) from 12 countries was reported.

 (8)
 (8)
 (8)
 (8)
 (2)
 (2)
 (8)
 (5)
 (8)
 (8)
 (6)
 (3)

Medal summary

Team trophies

References

External links
Official CACAC Website

Central American and Caribbean Age Group Championships in Athletics
International athletics competitions hosted by Puerto Rico
2003 in Puerto Rican sports
Central American and Caribbean U14
2003 in youth sport